São Lourenço da Mata is a city located in the greater Recife metropolitan area in the state of Pernambuco, with a population of 114,079 inhabitants (2020 estimate by IBGE). The city was one of the hosts of the 2014 FIFA World Cup together with Recife. The new Arena Cidade da Copa is set to boost the local economy with the construction of a new stadium, flats, car parks, hospital, technical school, shopping center, integrated metro-bus station, and road improvements.

Geography

 State - Pernambuco
 Region - RMR (Recife)
 Boundaries - Paudalho (N), Jaboatão dos Guararapes and Moreno, Pernambuco (S), Vitória de Santo Antão and Chã de Alegria (W), Recife and Camaragibe (E)
 Area - 264.35 km2
 Elevation - 16 m
 Hydrography - Capibaribe river
 Vegetation - Atlantic forest, capoeira, capoeirinha, and sugarcane
 Climate - Hot tropical and humid
 Annual average temperature - 25.5 °C
 Main road -  PE 005
 Distance to Recife - 18 km

Economy

The main economic activities in São Lourenço da Mata are based in general industry, especially the electrical and transportation sectors.

Economic Indicators

Economy by Sector
2006

Health Indicators

References

Municipalities in Pernambuco